TheBrain, formerly branded PersonalBrain, is a mind mapping and personal knowledge base software application from TheBrain Technologies. It uses a dynamic graphical interface that maps hierarchical and network relationships. It includes the ability to add links to Web pages and files as well as notes and events using a built-in calendar. It is available for Windows and Mac OS X on the desktop with mobile versions for Android and IOS. It is available in a free edition as well as in commercial editions with additional features.

See also 
List of mind mapping software

References

External links

Mind-mapping software